North Coast Railroad may refer to:
North Coast Railroad Authority, owner of the former Northwestern Pacific Railroad in California
North Coast Railroad (1992–1996), operator of the former Northwestern Pacific Railroad in California
North Coast Railroad (Washington), predecessor of the Union Pacific Railroad in Washington
North Pacific Coast Railroad, predecessor of the Northwestern Pacific Railroad in California

See also
 North Shore Railroad (disambiguation)